The Bureau of Enquiry and Analysis for Civil Aviation Safety (BEA) is an agency of the French government, responsible for investigating aviation accidents and incidents and making safety recommendations based on what is learned from those investigations.

Its headquarters are at Paris–Le Bourget Airport in Le Bourget, near Paris. The BEA has 96 employees in 2019, including 30 investigators and 12 investigative assistants. It is under the authority of the Ministry of Ecology, Sustainable Development, Transport and Housing.

The BEA was created in 1946. It operates under, amongst other texts, the French civil aviation and transports codes.

Following international rules, French authorities are responsible for investigating all aircraft accidents occurring in French territory or airspace, as well as accidents involving French aircraft occurring in international airspace or in other countries if the local authorities do not open a technical enquiry. They may also assist foreign investigation authorities at their request; in particular, BEA technical assistance is often sought by nations that do not wish to engage with the American FAA for political reasons.  They are also the investigating party for all Airbus aircraft.

Since 1 January 2014, the head of the BEA has been Rémi Jouty, engineer general of the Bridges, Waters and Forests, succeeding Jean-Paul Troadec.

Facilities

It is headquartered in Building 153 on the grounds of Paris–Le Bourget Airport in Le Bourget, near Paris. The BEA building is located in front of the French Air and Space Museum and houses offices and laboratories. Previously the building had  of space.

In addition the BEA has facilities at Melun Aerodrome. The BEA also has hangars and protected areas in Bonneuil-sur-Marne. The BEA has satellite offices in Aix-en-Provence, Bordeaux, Rennes, and Toulouse.

At one time the head office of the Bureau d'Enquêtes-Accidents (as it was known before 2001, and is still frequently if loosely referred to) was in the 15th arrondissement of Paris.

Gallery

See also

Aviation safety
Bureau d'Enquêtes sur les Événements de Mer (BEAmer) – French maritime transport investigation agency
French Land Transport Accident Investigation Bureau (Bureau d'Enquêtes sur les Accidents de Transport Terrestre; BEA-TT) – French ground transport investigation agency

References

External links 

BEA website 
BEA website 
 
 

Aviation organizations based in France
Aviation safety in France
Government agencies established in 1946
Government agencies of France
France
1946 establishments in France